Henry Timothy Hughton (born 18 November 1959) is a former professional footballer who played as a defender. Born in England, he represented Ireland at under-21 level.

Career

Club career
Hughton was born in Stratford, London. He played in the Football League for Leyton Orient, Crystal Palace and Brentford. He later played non-league football for Enfield.

International career
Hughton made one appearance for the Republic of Ireland under-21 team, against England in 1981.

Family
Hughton was born in England to an Irish mother and a Ghanaian father. He is the younger brother of Ireland international footballer Chris Hughton and uncle to Chris's son Cian Hughton, who also played League football.

References

1959 births
Living people
Footballers from the London Borough of Newham
Association football defenders
Republic of Ireland association footballers
Republic of Ireland under-21 international footballers
English footballers
Leyton Orient F.C. players
Crystal Palace F.C. players
Brentford F.C. players
Enfield F.C. players
English Football League players
National League (English football) players
Irish people of Ghanaian descent
Irish sportspeople of African descent
English people of Irish descent
English sportspeople of Ghanaian descent
Black British sportspeople
Black Irish sportspeople